The Sandman (William Baker, a.k.a. Flint Marko) is a  character appearing in American comic books published by Marvel Comics. A shapeshifter endowed through an accident with the ability to turn himself into sand, he started out as a recurring adversary to the superhero Spider-Man, has been slowly redeemed over time, eventually becoming an antihero. The Sandman has also been an enemy of the Fantastic Four and is a founding member of the supervillain teams the Sinister Six and the Frightful Four.

The character has been adapted into various other media incarnations of Spider-Man, including films, television series, and video games. In live-action, he was portrayed by Thomas Haden Church in Spider-Man 3 (2007) and the Marvel Cinematic Universe (MCU) film Spider-Man: No Way Home (2021). A creature based on the Sandman appeared in the MCU film Spider-Man: Far From Home (2019), which was actually an illusion created by a series of drones operated by Mysterio. In 2009, the Sandman was ranked as IGN's 72nd Greatest Comic Book Villain of All Time.

Publication history
The Sandman first appeared in The Amazing Spider-Man #4 (Sept. 1963), created by writer Stan Lee and artist Steve Ditko as an adversary of Spider-Man. The character returned in The Amazing Spider-Man Annual #1 and The Amazing Spider-Man #18-19, and was soon depicted in other comics, such as The Incredible Hulk and The Fantastic Four.

The Sandman served as the villain of the first issue of the Spider-Man spin-off series Marvel Team-Up (March 1972), which gave him a more morally ambiguous depiction. Writer Roy Thomas later commented, "I've been pleased to see Sandman's gradual redemption, whose seeds perhaps I helped plant in that story. He just seemed to me like a character who might have that in him ..." Subsequent stories stuck with the character's original depiction, but a decade later the more sympathetic portrayal of the Sandman returned, starting with Marvel Two-in-One #86 (April 1982), in which the Sandman is given co-star billing with his nemesis the Thing. The Sandman was later an ally of Spider-Man, as well as a reserve member of the Avengers and a member of Silver Sable's "Wild Pack" team of mercenaries.

Besides being most notable as a Spider-Man supervillain, he has also been depicted as a Fantastic Four antagonist in Stan Lee and Jack Kirby comic books (mostly due to being introduced as a founding member of the original Frightful Four) along with being on the heroic side (being an Avengers reserve member) until being introduced as a tragic supervillain in the Spider-Man comics once again.

Fictional character biography
William Baker was born in Queens, New York. When he was three years old, his father abandoned him and his mother. In these early years, she took her son to Coney Island beach. He lost himself happily in sand sculptures, a craft he would use in secondary school under the encouragement of his teacher (and first crush), Miss Flint.

In preparatory school, a boy named Vic bullied Baker until he learned to fight using an opponents' motions against themselves, a technique he performed as if he "slipped through their fingers like sand". Vic and his buddies eventually befriended Baker. In high school, William played on his school's football team, using the sport to channel his anger. While playing football, he adopted the nickname "Flint", after his former teacher.

After Vic incurs a large gambling debt to a mobster, he begs Flint to fix a football game he bet on to pay off his debt. Flint does, but is kicked off the team after the coach discovers his involvement. The coach taunts Baker, telling him that he will accomplish nothing of importance in his life. Flint hits his ex-coach, resulting in his expulsion from school and the beginning of his life of crime.

His illegal activity increases in depth and scope, turning him into a violent, bitter man. Eventually he ends up in prison on Ryker's Island where he meets his father, Floyd Baker. He is friendly to his father, but does not tell him who he is. He tells Floyd his nickname, Flint, and a false surname, Marko, inspired by his former coach's taunts about not "making a mark" on the world. He uses the alias Flint Marko from that point on (he changed his name also to prevent his mother from discovering he was a criminal). After Floyd is released from prison, Marko escapes.

Marko flees to a nuclear testing site on a beach near Savannah, Georgia where he comes into contact with sand that had been irradiated by an experimental reactor. His body and the radioactive sand bond, changing Marko's molecular structure into sand. Impressed, he calls himself the Sandman after his new powers.

Marko clashes with Peter Parker/Spider-Man for the first time in Peter's high school. Spider-Man defeats Marko with a vacuum cleaner and hands it over to the police. The Sandman escapes by getting through his window after turning himself to sand, but is recaptured by the Human Torch after the Torch lures the Sandman to a building by disguising himself as Spider-Man, then activating the sprinkler system. After this Marko resurfaces as a member of the Sinister Six, led by Doctor Octopus. He battles Spider-Man inside an airtight metal box, which is activated when Spider-Man touches a card saying where the Vulture is, but the Sandman is defeated due to Spider-Man having stronger lungs than he does.

Alongside the Enforcers, he captures the Human Torch but later succumbs to Spider-Man and the Human Torch.

After Spider-Man defeats Marko numerous times, Marko diverts his attention to other superheroes. He teams with the Wizard, Paste-Pot Pete (later known as the Trapster) and Medusa to form the Frightful Four to combat the Fantastic Four, which attacks during Reed and Sue's engagement party. The Fantastic Four, with the help of a few other superheroes, defeat the group. In another battle, in which he teams up with Blastaar and loses against the Four, he dons a diamond-patterned green costume designed by the Wizard. Later, he and the Hulk battle for the first time. The Mandarin joins him in his next conflict against the Hulk.

In time the Sandman discovers—-starting with his hands—-that his body can transform into glass and back again. He contracts cancer and takes over a medical research center, battling the Hulk again. He battles Wonder Man but is cured of his cancer by radiation.

Afterward, he allies himself with Hydro-Man to battle their mutual enemy, Spider-Man. An accident merges the two villains into a monster called the Mud-Thing. Spider-Man and the police are able to dehydrate the monstrosity. Months later, the supervillains manage to separate themselves and go their separate ways.

The time trapped with Hydro-Man caused Marko to question his bad life choices. The Thing, after an aborted attempt to fight Baker, urges him to straighten himself out and use his ability to do good. The story continues when he meets with the Thing for a second time to see a sports game.

Marko boards with the Cassadas and teams with Spider-Man against the Enforcers. The Sandman then makes sporadic appearances in Spider-Man comics assisting his former enemy. His first appearance has him coming to the rescue of Spider-Man and Silver Sable, who are outnumbered and surrounded by the Sinister Syndicate. Silver Sable is impressed by the Sandman's performance and recruits him as a freelance operative. Doctor Octopus coerces him to rejoin the Sinister Six, but Marko turns against them. Doctor Octopus turns him into glass for his treason. Spider-Man, however, saved the Sandman. Sandman also appears as part of the Outlaws, a group of reformed Spider-Man enemies, such as the Prowler, the Rocket Racer, the Puma and the Will o' the Wisp, that on occasion that would aid Spider-Man.

Later, he receives a presidential pardon and briefly joins the Avengers as a reserve member. Later, he becomes a full-time mercenary in the employ of Silver Sable, as a member of her Wild Pack, serving alongside heroes such as Paladin and Battlestar. The Sandman is one of the few heroes temporarily overwhelmed by their evil doubles during the Infinity War. This double almost kills them all.

Marko turns against Spider-Man and his sometimes ally the Thing and declares his allegiance to evil and his former employer, the Wizard. This change proved incompatible to what many fans had thought Sandman had become, a hero. This outcry caused Marvel to rush out a story which retconned The Amazing Spider-Man (vol. 2) #4 in which the Wizard had kidnapped the Sandman and used his mind control machine, the Id Machine, to turn him back into a villain.

The machine worked too well and the Sandman went about reforming the Sinister Six to destroy both Spider-Man and Doctor Octopus, only to be double-crossed by Venom, who the Sandman recruited as the sixth member of the team. During Venom's brawl against the Sandman, the vicious black symbiote's mouth rips a chunk of sand from the Sandman. That missing sand destabilizes the Sandman, causing him to lose his ability to maintain his human form. Before falling into the sewer (and as a nod to fans who rejected Marvel's attempt to re-villainize the character), the Sandman admitted that part of the reason for his fall from grace was the trouble he had to really cope with life on the good guys' side, and asks Spider-Man to tell his mother he was sorry he did not fulfill his promise to her, to be a force for good. The Sandman washes away and slides down a sewer, from which he mixes into Jones Beach, New York and is thought dead.

The Sandman's body and mind are scattered throughout the beach. This separation lasts too long for him, causing his mind to split into good and its opposite, evil, which when dominant created sand vortexes to ensnare beachcombers. Spider-Man arrived to confront the Sandman, ultimately using the Sandman's mental instability to free his captives and cause him to explode.

His sand wafts throughout New York and touches down into piles forming beings that personify him: the good, the bad, the gentle and the innocent. Spider-Man locates these Sandmen to convince them to unify. The Sandman's evil persona merges with his innocent and gentle personas, but the Sandman's good persona rebuffs the evil one. Because the Sandman's mind can handle his personality in separation for only a limited time, he loses his ability to retain himself, crumbling and blowing away, leaving Spider-Man to ponder the nature of his scuttled foe.

The Sandman is one of the villains recruited to recover the Identity Disc, but during its recovery seemingly he is killed in a mutiny. At the series' end, the Sandman is found alive and working with the Vulture to manipulate the other villains.

In the storyline "Sandblasted", in Friendly Neighborhood Spider-Man #17–19 (April–June 2007), the Sandman asks Spider-Man to help him redeem his father, who has been charged with and imprisoned for murdering a homeless man. He admits his father was a petty criminal, but insists he would not commit murder. Marko also said the victim resembles Peter Parker's Uncle Ben, who had been murdered years before then. The Sandman and Spider-Man find the killer, the Chameleon 2211. The Chameleon 2211 kills the Uncle Ben who the Hobgoblin 2211 brought from an alternate universe and had been posing as him after that. Thanks to Spider-Man, Floyd Baker is switched with the Chameleon 2211 and saved, for which the Sandman thanks Spider-Man.

The Sandman returned in "Spider-Man: The Gauntlet" storyline, which redefined the character and his powers/mental state. While investigating a series of murders and a missing girl named Keemia Alvarado, whose mother is a victim of those murders, Spider-Man traces the murders and the abduction to the Sandman, the girl's father, who is hiding on Governor's Island with Keemia. The Sandman's powers have evolved to where he can create duplicates of himself who have their own personalities and, to Marko's shock, claim they committed the murders. Spider-Man sneaks away and uses a fan to obliterate the Sandmen. Originally Spider-Man believed Keemia would be handed to her grandmother, but instead she was sent to a foster home by Child Protective Services. Carlie Cooper is exonerated upon being under police suspicion for tampering with the murder evidences, but the Sandman is still at large.

During the "Origin of the Species" storyline, the Sandman is among the supervillains invited by Doctor Octopus to join his villains' team where he becomes involved in a plot to receive a reward and securing some specific items for him. The Sandman went after Spider-Man for Menace's infant, believing that Doctor Octopus would reward him by reuniting him with Keemia. He ended up being accidentally struck with lightning by Electro, temporarily turning him into fulgurite. Spider-Man goes on a rampage against all the villains after the Chameleon stole the infant and tricked him into believing it had died. At the dock, the Sandman, along with the Shocker and the Enforcers, are hiding. However, Spider-Man collapses the floor of the building which falls into the water. The Sandman attempts to rise to attack, but Spider-Man shoots him using the Shocker's vibrational air-blasts.

In Big Time, he is part of the new Sinister Six along with Mysterio, the Rhino, Doctor Octopus, the Chameleon and Electro. He rises up against Doctor Octopus' plan to detonate New York, saying Keemia is still there. He is later angered when, during a confrontation between the Sinister Six and the Intelligencia, Doctor Octopus teleports the Wizard into the upper atmosphere using the Intelligencia's equipment. The Sandman was talking with his former Frightful Four teammate and old friend at the time. When the Mad Thinker goes after Electro, the Sandman violently attacks him, claiming that he did not want to lose any more friends.

When Doctor Octopus puts his plan into action, the Sandman is satisfied with the job because of the planned 2 billion dollar "compensation fee", which he reasons will help him gain custody of Keemia. However, although sent to guard a facility in the Sahara Desert giving him complete control of the largest body of sand in the world, he is defeated by Spider-Man, the Black Widow and Silver Sable when Spider-Man identifies and isolates the one grain of sand that contains his conscious mind. Spider-Man and Silver Sable then violently interrogate the Sandman to reveal all of Doctor Octopus' secrets to them.

Following the "Dying Wish" storyline, the Sandman's captive form is later stolen from the Baxter Building by the Superior Spider-Man (Doctor Octopus' mind in Spider-Man's body) where he takes him to his underwater lab. The Sandman, the Chameleon, Electro, Mysterion (an impersonator of Mysterio), and the Vulture are later seen as part of a team led by the Superior Spider-Man called the "Superior Six". The Superior Spider-Man has been temporarily controlling their minds to redeem them for their crimes. He does this by forcing them do heroic deeds against their will, some of which almost get some of them killed. Every time he is done controlling them, he puts them back in their containment cells. They eventually break free of the Superior Spider-Man's control and attempt to exact revenge on the wall-crawler, while nearly destroying New York to do so. With the help of Sun Girl, the Superior Spider-Man is barely able to stop the Superior Six.

Inspired by the heroism of the villains who had their moralities inverted by the events of "AXIS", the Sandman rejoins one of his old gangs and breaks into Ryker's Island in search of the group's leader Dixon. Upon reaching Dixon's cell, the Sandman turns on and incapacitates him and his followers. He then leaves with Dixon's cellmate, a "good egg" whom the Sandman had deemed deserving of a second chance.

During the "Secret Wars" storyline, the Sandman is among the villains at the Kingpin's viewing party of the incursion between Earth-616 and Earth-1610.

The Sandman later appears as a member of the Sinister Six led by Aaron Davis in a recolored Iron Spider armor. He accompanied the Sinister Six in a plot to steal a decommissioned S.H.I.E.L.D. Helicarrier.

During the "Infinity Wars" storyline, the Sandman is among the villains that accompany Turk Barrett to his meeting with the Infinity Watch at Central Park.

The Sandman later discovered that he is starting to lose the consistency of his body. When the Mad Thinker and the Wizard are unable to find a solution to counter this and the Sandman is hospitalized after collapsing, he is visited by Spider-Man, who took him to the beach that the Sandman visited in his childhood and stayed with him until his body broke down. After that happened, Spider-Man discovered that the Sandman did not die and that he lost the ability to assume a human shape, where he now sports a blob-shaped body. When the Sandman's body is taken over by a future version of the Sandman from Earth-51838 where the sun went out, Spider-Man received some of the Sandman's powers and used them to defeat the Sandman of Earth-51838 and sends him back to his reality using the Multisect and assistance from the Human Torch. After bidding farewell to Spider-Man, the Sandman left to get adjusted to his new form while having developed a fear of his newly-discovered immortality.

At an unknown beach, Sandman somehow regained his human shape and has lost his sense of direction. Doctor Octopus helped Sandman regain his sense of direction which pleases Kindred.

Powers and abilities
The Sandman has the ability to transform his body. He can will his body to be hardened, compacted, dispersed or shaped, or a combination of those qualities, an Earth manipulation of sand and rock particles. More often than not in combat, this ability enables him to absorb most blows with little to no ill effect other than reforming himself, a relatively fast action. His striped shirt and cargo pants are colored sand to make him appear as if he wears clothes. Even when soaked, he was able to stretch his sand molecules, growing to double his size.

Sandman can mold his arms and hands into shapes, such as a mace or a sledgehammer, to battle Spider-Man and his other enemies. His mass, strength and shape shifting ability correspond to the number of sand and rock particles that comprise him. The more he incorporates (nearby) sand grains and rock granules into his body, the more those qualities are enhanced. Even though he controls every particle in his body, his mind exists in the astral plane. He can turn himself into a sandstorm, which enables him to fly great distances and to suffocate his enemies.

His body takes on sand's chemical qualities, impervious to many, but not all, elements. Once, cement's ingredients were mixed into Sandman. That mixture turned him into cement that dried, rendering him immobile. Despite this frailty he remained alive, but in a coma-like state for a while before he returned to normal. In addition to his superb endurance, the Sandman possesses superhuman strength several times more than Spider-Man's and on a par with the Thing's.

In a story with the Wizard, the Wizard fashioned Sandman a green suit with a belt that contained three buttons that allowed various chemicals to mix into the Sandman's body to enable him to change himself into consistencies related to sand. The suit, like the Sandman's usual "clothes", changed into sand with him. Eventually, with the disbanding of the original Frightful Four, the Sandman stopped using the suit.

Temperature does alter the Sandman. At 3,400 degrees Fahrenheit his body turns into glass, also a form he can control. Unlike the Sandman's fast transformation from sand to glass, his transformation from glass to sand takes time.

Although he is invulnerable to most physical attacks, even projectiles because they pass through him, water is capable of harming him. There are some exceptions, for example while fighting Venom, the villain's powerful mouth ripped cleanly and swiftly into the Sandman. The amount of sand removed abruptly, and perhaps because of Venom's venoms, left the mass of the Sandman in contortion, crippled beyond immediate repair. The Sandman began to disintegrate, then flowed down a drain, and then washed up onto and into a beach.

It has been revealed that, while the Sandman can absorb and lose sand, his body must retain one key particle of sand that contains his conscious mind, allowing Spider-Man to defeat him once by isolating that one grain from the rest of the Sandman (although the difficulty involved in setting up these events in the first place makes it impractical to use regularly).

Family members
This section lists the known relatives of Sandman:

 Floyd Baker - The father of William Baker, who was unaware that he was the Sandman during his time in prison.
 Keemia Alvarado - The foster child of the Sandman.
 Mrs. Baker (first name unknown) - The mother of William Baker.

Other characters named the Sandman
There have been some other characters in Marvel Comics that have been named the "Sandman":

 In Marvel Mystery Comics, the Sandman that appears is the Sandman of legend. He lives in the Land of Dreams, which is located in the Realm of Fairies within the potentially imaginary world of Nowhere. The Sandman ruled over the realm and would place a blanket over it every day. Those who grabbed a dream from the dream tree would have a dream based on whatever they grabbed from the tree and awaken again when the Sandman removed the blanket over his land. Anyone who did not grab a dream would end up in an eternal, dreamless sleep.
 In Journey into Mystery, an alien Sandman crash-landed on Earth where he ended up in Mexico. The local tribespeople thought it was an evil spirit. They took him while he was still weak from his crash and sealed him in a cave with no air and light, where he remained in a state of suspended animation. By the early 1960s, a vacationing Marine named Steve Bronson and his family accidentally unleashed the alien Sandman on the world. The alien Sandman regained its consciousness, recounted its past to the Bronson family and planned to conquer the Earth. Steve Bronson tried to oppose the alien Sandman, but it proved invulnerable to physical assault. The alien Sandman ordered the Bronsons to transport him to North America, so he could observe the most powerful nation on the planet before putting his plan into action. Steve Bronson was able to alert the military to the alien Sandman's presence, but they also proved ineffective in dealing with the extraterrestrial threat. Bullets went right through him, gas was ineffectual because he does not breathe and while bombs would scatter his pieces, he proved capable of reforming himself afterwards. The alien Sandman planned to increase its size by absorbing every sand on the beaches until nothing can stop him. Steve Bronson's son Bobby heard about the plan and headed to the beach with a plan of his own. Bobby threw a pile of water over the sand, which made the alien Sandman soggy to the point where he could not move. The military quickly transported the alien Sandman's body to a top-secret underground facility where he has remained ever since.
 There was an android version of the Sandman who was created by the Puppet Master and the Mad Thinker to fight the Fantastic Four.

Other versions

1602
Marvel 1602: Fantastick Four, a sequel to Neil Gaiman's Marvel 1602 written by Peter David, features the 1602 version of the Marvel Sandman. While he physically resembles Flint Marko, he has the pale skin and glowing eyes of Gaiman's Morpheus. He also alludes to an ability to summon nightmares. In issue #4 he is able to send Ben Grimm to sleep by blowing a vapor or dust at him. Both the Sandman and the Trapster are crushed by falling debris when Bensaylum collapses.

Amazing Spider-Man: Renew Your Vows
During the Secret Wars storyline in the pages of Amazing Spider-Man: Renew Your Vows, a version of the Sandman lives in the Battleworld domain of the Regency. The Sandman allied himself with the rebel forces at S.H.I.E.L.D. following Regent conquering the world, where part of it became the Battleworld domain of The Regency. When Spider-Man exposes himself and is attacked by the Sinister Six, the Sandman appears and tries to convince Spider-Man to follow him, but Spider-Man does not listen and assume the Sandman is part of the Six. They are captured by Regent and he reads the Sandman's mind to find out S.H.I.E.L.D's location. One of Spot's portals was sewn into the Sandman, and as a last resort, he sacrifices himself to allow the rebels to break in, using the portal to stop Regent and rescue Spider-Man.

House of M: Masters of Evil
The Sandman appears as a member of the Hood's Masters of Evil. He was killed by both Rogue and Marrow during the riot at Santo Rico.

JLA/Avengers
The Sandman appears in the last issue among the Avengers fighting through Krona's stronghold, in a panel where he defeats the Scorpion.

Marvel Noir
In the Marvel Noir universe, the Sandman exists, and exhibits slightly different powers than the one in the mainstream Universe. Whilst he cannot externally change into sand, he can alter his internal physiology, and, as Spider-Man noted, his skin can feel like granite. He is an enforcer for the Crime Master.

Marvel Zombies
In Marvel Zombies: Dead Days, the Sandman, having become a zombie, appears to attack Wolverine and Magneto alongside several other Spider-Man villains during an attempt to evacuate innocent civilians into a S.H.I.E.L.D. Helicarrier. The six villains are repelled. It is shown in Marvel Zombies Return #1 that the Zombie Spider-Man is responsible for infecting this universe's Flint Marko.

Marvel Zombies Return
A version of the Sandman similar to a past version of his 616 counterpart appears as part of a version of the Sinister Six. After Zombie Spider-Man teleports into this reality, the Kingpin sends the Six to fight "Spider-Man". The other five members are violently killed by the Zombie Spider-Man and the Sandman flees, later encountering and killing his own reality's Spider-Man out of fear by forcing his own sand body mass down Spider-Man's throat and causing his stomach to bloat to massive proportions before violently exploding out of his chest. He is also disappointed by the seeming betrayal of his enemy, thinking that if Spider-Man is now willing to kill, then the Sandman will also kill. Decades later, the Sandman is infused with a nanite cure developed by Tony Stark and the Zombie Spider-Man that incorporates Wolverine's healing factor, which allows him to safely confront the zombies. Working with a few allies that oppose the murderous zombies, the Sandman springs his trap. All the zombies fall, destroyed from within. Upon his final death, Zombie Spider-Man thanks the Sandman for avenging Aunt May and Mary Jane, to which the Sandman replies, "Good riddance, ya disgusting freak". He is later congratulated by Uatu the Watcher for his great help.

Mini-Marvels
The Sandman makes a cameo in Mini-Marvels when he attacks Spider-Man and the Team Poder while they were playing in a sandbox. He is defeated and turned into a sand castle.

Spider-Ham
In Peter Porker, the Spectacular Spider-Ham #12, the Sandman appears as a manatee called the Sandmanatee. He later joined the Sinister Swine and was turned to glass.

Spider-Man: Reign
In Spider-Man: Reign, the Sandman is a part of an elderly Sinister Six which is under the control of the tyrannical power structure running New York. During the showdown between rebellious citizens at the Mayor's tower, the Sandman encounters his super-powered daughter, Susie, but loses her due to wounds inflicted by the police. As such he abandons the Six and assists Spider-Man in defeating the tyrants.

Ultimate Marvel
In the Ultimate Marvel Universe, Flint Marko is a genetic mutation created by industrialist Justin Hammer who attempts to recreate the Super Soldier Serum. Shortly after Justin Hammer dies of a heart attack during Spider-Man's fight with Doctor Octopus, S.H.I.E.L.D. infiltrates Hammer's factory to obtain experiments Hammer had been working on. Marko uses this opportunity to escape and wreak havoc in New Jersey. S.H.I.E.L.D., with the help of Spider-Man, contains him and imprisons him in a S.H.I.E.L.D holding facility.

There, he meets fellow genetically altered criminals Green Goblin, Doctor Octopus, Electro, and Kraven the Hunter. Under the Green Goblin's and Doctor Octopus's leadership, they break free and capture Spider-Man. They tie him to a chair, unmask, and humiliate Peter for being a child and for Norman Osborn and Otto Octavius' involvement in his creation. Osborn then blackmails Peter into joining the team, forming the Ultimate Six. Marko participates with the group in an attack on the White House. Iron Man defeats Marko by having S.H.I.E.L.D. Control upload a genetic code sequence into his armor enabling him to subject Marko to a temporary genetic paralysis. After the battle, S.H.I.E.L.D. seals Marko in various jars and keeps them frozen.

Artist Mark Bagley, who drew the first 100+ issues of Ultimate Spider-Man, noted in his rough designs for the Ultimate Sandman that he would appear "naked" most of the time. As he wanted to go with the more 'realistic' feel of the Ultimate imprint, he doubted whether Flint Marko's clothing had unstable molecules like his body.

Alongside the rest of the Ultimate Six who are now joined by Vulture, the Sandman plays a role in the "Death of Spider-Man" storyline. Norman Osborn breaks him and the rest out of the Triskelion, and after their escape, informs them that God wishes for them to kill Peter Parker. When Electro is shot by Aunt May, an electric surge knocks out Kraven, the Sandman, and the Vulture.

In other media

Television
 The Sandman appears in the Spider-Man (1967) episode "Sands of Crime", voiced by Tom Harvey.
 The Sandman appears in the Fantastic Four (1978) episode "The Frightful Four" as a member of the titular group.
 The Sandman appears in the Spider-Man (1981) episode "The Coming of the Sandman", voiced by Neil Ross.
 The Sandman appears in the Spider-Man and His Amazing Friends episode "Spider-Man: Unmasked!", voiced by Christopher Collins.
 The Sandman was originally going to appear in Spider-Man: The Animated Series. However, the series' creators did not want to interfere with the continuity of James Cameron's proposed Spider-Man film at the time, in which the Sandman and Electro were supposed to appear. While Electro was belatedly introduced into the series when Cameron's film fell through, the Sandman remained unseen. Despite this, the character Hydro-Man fulfilled several similar roles and it has been stated that he was essentially used as a replacement for the Sandman. Also due to Cameron's film, the Sandman did not appear in Fantastic Four (1994).
 Flint Marko / Sandman appears in The Spectacular Spider-Man, voiced by John DiMaggio. First appearing in the pilot episode "Survival of the Fittest", this version was a petty crook and partner of Alex O'Hirn who works for the crime boss Tombstone, but is consistently caught by Spider-Man. In the episode "Competition", Marko is used as a guinea pig in Oscorp's underground experiments, which results in him gaining sand-based powers. Though he is offered a chance at revenge against Spider-Man, he refuses as he only wants a "big score". Marko becomes an independent criminal, but is eventually caught by Spider-Man once more. In the episodes "Group Therapy" and "Reinforcement", Marko joins two iterations of the Sinister Six to get revenge on Spider-Man, but is defeated both times. In the episode "First Steps", Sandman becomes more powerful during his time in prison after learning to absorb extra sand and escapes again to achieve his "big score" by attacking an oil tanker. However, his humane side shows through when he helps Spider-Man evacuate the crew before the tanker explodes and seemingly sacrifices himself to contain the explosion. While Spider-Man believes he died, Sandman is later revealed to have survived.
 The Sandman appears in Ultimate Spider-Man, voiced by Dee Bradley Baker. Debuting in the episode "Snow Day", Spider-Man and his fellow S.H.I.E.L.D. trainees encounter Sandman on an island they were using as a vacation spot in the form of the young boy named Sandy (voiced by Tara Strong).) However, the team later discovers Sandman was a prison escapee who gained his powers in an explosion and that S.H.I.E.L.D. abandoned him on the island as no ordinary prison could hold him. Though they escape in a quinjet, Sandman sneaks aboard and tries to attack them, only to be crystallized by Iron Fist and later imprisoned in a rotating hourglass-like containment unit. In the episode "Sandman Returns", the Awesome Android frees Sandman, who helps Spider-Man defeat it. In response, the web-slinger tries to help him become a hero, but Sandman loses control of his emotions. Despite his allies telling him otherwise, Spider-Man reasons with Sandman and convinces him to return to S.H.I.E.L.D.'s custody. In the episode "Beached", the Sandman is captured and cloned by Doctor Octopus, who wants the "Ultimate Sandman" to join his HYDRA-backed Sinister Six. However, Spider-Man and Iron Spider discover his plot and use an electronic disruption to render the clones inert so the original Sandman can reabsorb them. Though Doctor Octopus escapes, Spider-Man allows the Sandman to stay outside the Triskelion. In the episode "The New Sinister Six" Pt. 2, the Sandman fights off Hydro-Man during the Sinister Six's attack on the Triskelion. Sandman also makes minor appearances in later episodes, having been fully redeemed and indebted himself to Spider-Man.
 Flint Marko / Sandman appears in a self-titled episode of Spider-Man (2017), voiced by Travis Willingham. This version is a former minion of Hammerhead and has a daughter named Keemia Marko. After failing Hammerhead too many times, Flint was buried in sand and toxic waste and presumed dead, but was mutated and acquired sand-based powers.
 The Sandman appears in Spidey and His Amazing Friends, voiced by Thomas F. Wilson.

Film
 An original incarnation of the Sandman appears in James Cameron's aborted Spider-Man film script, with Michael Biehn being considered for the role. This version would have been Carlton Strand's henchman Boyd, who was mutated by an accident involving Philadelphia Experiment-esque bilocation and atom-mixing.
 Thomas Haden Church portrays Flint Marko / Sandman in two Marvel films. This version is portrayed as a tragic and sympathetic criminal who is desperate to raise money for his critically ill daughter, Penny, and becomes the Sandman after an accident involving an experimental particle accelerator that bonded him with sand at the molecular level, giving him sand-based shapeshifting abilities. Furthermore, he played a part in Spider-Man's origin story, being accidentally responsible for the death of the latter's uncle Ben Parker.
 Marko first appears in the Sony film Spider-Man 3 (2007). After breaking out of prison, he visits his family, but his upset ex-wife Emma forces him to leave. While on the run from police, he stumbles upon a particle physics test facility that transforms him into the Sandman. Using his newly-acquired powers, Marko attacks an armored car and is confronted by Spider-Man, but manages to escape. After Spider-Man obtains his black suit, which increases his aggressiveness, and learns that Marko was Ben's killer, he fights and seemingly kills him in the sewers. Marko later reconstitutes himself and encounters Venom, who persuades him to join forces to kill Spider-Man. They kidnap Mary Jane Watson and lure Spider-Man to a construction site, where they nearly succeed until Harry Osborn intervenes and defeats Marko. Following the battle, Marko, now aware of Spider-Man's identity, approaches him to apologize and come to terms with the truth about Ben's murder: during the robbery, Marko tried to steal Ben's car while holding the man at gunpoint, but his partner, Dennis Carradine, had startled him, causing Marko to pull the trigger by accident. Shocked by what happened, Marko later turned himself in. Upon learning about Marko's troubled history and what he had been through, Spider-Man forgives Marko and allows him to escape.
 Church reprises his role in the Marvel Cinematic Universe (MCU) film Spider-Man: No Way Home (2021), with director Jon Watts providing motion capture. Sometime after the events of Spider-Man 3, he ends up in another universe due to a botched spell, where he helps its version of Spider-Man (later dubbed "Peter-One") defeat an Electro from a separate universe before being teleported to and imprisoned in the New York Sanctum alongside other alternate universe-displaced supervillains. As his abilities become unstable and he withers away, Marko receives a chance at a cure from Peter-One, but is convinced by the Green Goblin to fight back instead. Marko, adamant about returning to his universe, later assists Electro and the Lizard in fighting Peter-One until his version of Spider-Man cures him of his powers, reverting Marko to his human state before Doctor Strange returns him and the other displaced individuals to their respective universes.
 A member of the Elementals inspired by the Sandman appears in the MCU film Spider-Man: Far From Home. Identified as the Earth Elemental, it had power over rocks and sand. It attacked Mexico, during which it encountered Nick Fury and Maria Hill before Mysterio defeated it off-screen. Spider-Man later discovers the Elementals were illusions created by Mysterio and his fellow ex-Stark Industries employees as part of his plot to obtain Tony Stark's technology and fraudulently establish himself as a superhero.

Video games
 The Sandman appears in Questprobe featuring Spider-Man.
 The Sandman appears as a boss in Spider-Man vs. The Kingpin.
 The Sandman appears as a boss in Spider-Man: Return of the Sinister Six as a member of the titular team.
 The Sandman appears as a boss in Spider-Man 2: The Sinister Six. This version is a member of the Sinister Six.
 The Sandman appears in Spider-Man 2: Enter Electro, voiced by Daran Norris. This version is an underling of Electro.
 Flint Marko / Sandman appears in the Spider-Man 3 film tie-in game, voiced by Thomas Haden Church. Similarly to the film, this version is an escaped convict looking to provide for his family and becomes the Sandman after accidentally falling into a pit of sand that scientists were experimenting on while running from the police. However, his identity as Ben Parker's killer is omitted. After robbing a bank, the Sandman is pursued into the subway system by a symbiote-suited Spider-Man. During their battle, Spider-Man gets overwhelmed by the symbiote's influence and violently washes the Sandman down the sewer line. Sandman survives, but is later blackmailed by Venom into helping him kill Spider-Man or else his daughter will be killed. The final battle is similar to that of the film, with Sandman being defeated by Harry Osborn. After the battle, Sandman is reunited with his daughter, who had been rescued by the police, and apologizes to Spider-Man before leaving in peace.
 The Sandman appears as a boss and playable character in Spider-Man: Friend or Foe, voiced by Fred Tatasciore. This version's design is inspired by Thomas Haden Church's portrayal. He, among other supervillains, fight Spider-Man until they are all attacked by P.H.A.N.T.O.M.s under Mysterio's command. The Sandman is captured along with the other villains, placed under mind control, and sent to Cairo to retrieve a meteor shard located there. Spider-Man later defeats the Sandman and destroys the mind-control device before the latter joins him to exact revenge on Mysterio.
 The Sandman appears as a boss in Spider-Man: The Battle Within.
 The Sandman appears as an assist character in the PS2 and PSP versions of Spider-Man: Web of Shadows.
 The Sandman appears as a boss in Spider-Man: Shattered Dimensions voiced by Dimitri Diatchenko. He obtains a fragment of the Tablet of Order and Chaos, which augments his powers to the point where he can control any sand simply by looking at it, but it gradually fractures his mind from overextending himself. Spider-Man fights him in an abandoned quarry and eventually defeats him, claiming his tablet fragment.
 The Sandman appears as a boss, later unlockable character, in Marvel: Avengers Alliance.
 The Sandman appears as a boss and playable character in Lego Marvel Super Heroes, voiced by Dee Bradley Baker.
 Various alternate reality versions of Sandman appear as bosses in Spider-Man Unlimited, voiced by Travis Willingham. They joined a multiversal Sinister Six to harvest iso-8 crystals.
 The Sandman appears as a playable character in Marvel: Future Fight.
 The Sandman appears as a playable character in Marvel Puzzle Quest.
 The Sandman appears as a playable character in Lego Marvel Super Heroes 2.
 The Sandman appears as a boss in Marvel Ultimate Alliance 3: The Black Order, voiced by Richard Epcar. He joins the Sinister Six in fighting Spider-Man and the Guardians of the Galaxy after escaping from the Raft, but is ultimately defeated.

References

External links
 Sandman at Marvel.com
 
 
 
 
 Sandman at Comic Vine
 

Action film villains
Villains in animated television series
Avengers (comics) characters
Characters created by Stan Lee
Characters created by Steve Ditko
Comics characters introduced in 1963
Fictional characters from Queens, New York
Fictional characters who can change size
Fictional characters who can stretch themselves
Fictional characters with density control abilities
Fictional characters with earth or stone abilities
Fictional characters with superhuman durability or invulnerability
Fictional henchmen
Film supervillains
Marvel Comics characters who are shapeshifters
Marvel Comics characters with accelerated healing
Marvel Comics characters with superhuman strength
Marvel Comics film characters
Marvel Comics male superheroes
Marvel Comics male supervillains
Marvel Comics mutates
Marvel Comics superheroes
Sandman
Spider-Man characters